Mohammad Shams Aalam Shaikh (born 17 July 1986) is an Indian Para swimmer. He won four gold medals at the Indian Open Para Swimming Championship in 2018, and a bronze medal at the 2016 Can-Am Para Swimming Championships held in Gatineau, Quebec. He also represented India at the World Para Swimming Championship Maderia Portugal 2022 & 2018 Asian Para Games in Jakarta, Indonesia. He is also awarded with the award for best sportsperson with disability by the president of India on 3rd December 2021

Early life
Aalam was born in Rathos Village, Madhubani District, Bihar and later moved to Mumbai with his family. At the age of 24, he developed a benign tumour in his lower back which immobilized his lower half due to unsuccessful surgeries.

Athletic career
Aalam Shaikh was interested in karate and participated in state and national karate events before 2010. After his surgery, he started to train as a swimmer. He won a total of 15 medals at the 12th to 17th Indian National Para Swimming Championship, and was selected for the Indian contingent for the 2018 Asian Para Games to participate at the S5 category for 50M and 100M Butterfly and Freestyle and various other categories. Aalam won Bronze at the 2016 Can-Am Para Swimming Championships held in Gatineau, Quebec in the men's 100m Breaststroke SB4 category.

On 8 April 2017 he swam 8 km in 4 hours at Candolim Beach, Goa.  This was the world record for longest open sea swimming by a paraplegic person.

In the 20th National Para-Swimming Championship, Shams won gold medals in 50m butterfly and 150m medley categories along with one silver in 100m freestyle.

Personal life
He Lives in Dharavi, Mumbai and holds a bachelor's degree in mechanical engineering from Rizvi College of Engineering and MBA from Sathyabama University, Chennai

He was awarded best emerging leader in disability sports and sports diplomacy by the U.S. Department of state global sports mentoring program 2018.

He has been interviewed by Kiran Rai for the 300 most influential people in Asia 2020 published by The New York Press News Agency.He has been awarded the role model state award for the empowerment of Persons with Disabilities by the Social Welfare Department, Government of Bihar on the occasion of International Day of Persons with Disabilities 2020 and the best international athlete of the year 2020 by Bihar Para Sports Association.

See also
Mariyappan Thangavelu

References

1986 births
Living people
Athletes from Bihar
People from Madhubani district
Paralympic athletes of India
Indian male swimmers
20th-century Indian people
21st-century Indian people